Calytrix angulata, commonly known as yellow starflower, is a species of plant in the myrtle family Myrtaceae that is endemic to Western Australia.

It blooms between August and January producing cream-yellow star-shaped flowers

Commonly found on plains and slopes in the Swan Coastal Plain extending into the South West and Wheatbelt regions of Western Australia where it grows in sandy soils.

The species was first described by the botanist John Lindley in 1839 in the work A Sketch of the Vegetation of the Swan River Colony. Johannes Conrad Schauer described the plant in 1843 as Calycothrix angulata in Monographia Myrtacearum Xerocarpicarum.

References

Plants described in 1839
angulata
Flora of Western Australia